A gubernatorial election was held on 10 December 1978 to elect the Governor of ,  who is the southernmost and westernmost prefecture of Japan.

The gubernatorial election was held because Kōichi Taira, who was first elected in the 1976 election, collapsed from a cerebral thrombosis and resigned as governor in November 1978.

Candidates 

Chibana Hideo, 69, endorsed by the union of the left (Progress and Unity), including the OSMP, JSP and JCP.  
Junji Nishime, 57, former Representative of the LDP, also backed by the DSP.

Results 

It was the first time since the return of Okinawa that the LDP win the prefecture government.

References 

1978 elections in Japan
Okinawa gubernatorial elections